is a passenger railway station in the city of Funabashi, Chiba, Japan, operated by East Japan Railway Company (JR East).

Lines

Station layout

The station consists of an elevated island platform serving two tracks, with the station building underneath. The station is staffed.

Platforms

History
Shimōsa-Nakayama Station opened on 12 April 1895.

Passenger statistics
In fiscal 2019, the station was used by an average of 24,181 passengers daily (boarding passengers only).

The passenger figures (boarding passengers only) for previous years are as shown below:

Surrounding area

South side
 Keisei Nakayama Station (Keisei Main Line)
 Hokekyō-ji Temple

North side
 Funabashi No. 6 Junior High School

See also
 List of railway stations in Japan

References

External links

 Shimōsa-Nakayama Station information (JR East) 

Railway stations in Japan opened in 1895
Railway stations in Chiba Prefecture
Funabashi